Bareh Kheyreh (also Romanized as Bara Khaireh, Bareh-ye Kheyreh, Bare-Xeyre, Berah Kheyreh; also known as Bard-e Kheyreh) is a village in Boluran Rural District, Darb-e Gonbad District, Kuhdasht County, Lorestan Province, Iran. At the 2006 census, its population was 153, in 33 families.

References 

Towns and villages in Kuhdasht County